The Ministry of Economic and Business Affairs, now called the Ministry of Business and Growth, is a ministry that was established by the first Helle Thorning-Schmidt cabinet.

The ministry was created in 2001 as a merger between the Ministry of Economic Affairs and the Ministry of Trade and Industry. After the 2011 election the ministry was divided into two; Ministry of Economic Affairs and the Interior and Ministry of Business and Growth. Henrik Sass Larsen is current minister of Business and Growth and Margrethe Vestager is current minister of Economic Affairs and the Interior.

List of ministers

Citations

References

Economic and Business Affairs
Denmark, Economic and Business Affairs